Osserain-Rivareyte is a commune in the Pyrénées-Atlantiques department in south-western France.

It is located in the historical province of Soule.

See also
Communes of the Pyrénées-Atlantiques department

References

Communes of Pyrénées-Atlantiques
Pyrénées-Atlantiques communes articles needing translation from French Wikipedia